Go! is a studio album by jazz musician Dexter Gordon featuring Sonny Clark, Butch Warren and Billy Higgins, recorded on August 27, 1962 and released in the same year on Blue Note. According to the liner notes by Ira Gitler, this session was "not recorded in a nightclub performance but, in its informal symmetry, it matches the relaxed atmosphere that the best of those made in that manner engender. Everyone was really together, in all the most positive meanings of that word." It was recorded by Rudy Van Gelder at the Van Gelder Studio in Englewood Cliffs.

Critical reception and legacy

Since its release, Go! has received very positive reviews from critics, with uDiscover Music—published by Universal Music Group—declaring that it is "unanimously hailed by jazz critics as one of his greatest ever albums". AllMusic giving it a five star rating. The album was re-released in March 1999 as part of Blue Note's RVG Series, produced by Michael Cuscuna. In 2019, Go! was selected by the Library of Congress for preservation in the National Recording Registry for being "culturally, historically, or aesthetically significant".

Track listing

Personnel
Dexter Gordon – tenor saxophone
Sonny Clark – piano
Butch Warren – bass
Billy Higgins – drums

Notes

External links

1962 albums
Dexter Gordon albums
Blue Note Records albums
Albums produced by Alfred Lion
Albums recorded at Van Gelder Studio
Albums produced by Michael Cuscuna
United States National Recording Registry recordings
United States National Recording Registry albums